The spheno-maxillary fossa is a small triangular space situated at the angle of the junction of the spheno-maxillary and pterygo-maxillary fissures, and placed beneath the apex of the orbit. It is formed above by the under surface of the body of the sphenoid and by the orbital process of the palate bone.

References
Gray's Anatomy, pg.112

Skull